Nam Myo Ho Ren Ge Kyo is an album by Acid Mothers Temple & The Melting Paraiso U.F.O., released in 2007 by Ace Fu Records.

Track listing

Personnel 
 Kitagawa Hao - voice, hot spice & alcohol
 Tsuyama Atsushi - monster bass, voice, acoustic guitar, one-legged flute, alto recorder, cosmic joker
 Higashi Hiroshi - synthesizer, voice, dancin' king
 Shimura Koji - drums, Latino cool
 Ono Ryoko - alto sax, flute, aesthetic perverted karman
 Kawabata Makoto - electric guitar, voice, hurdy-gurdy, acoustic guitar, glockenspiel, tambura, sarangi, speed guru

Technical personnel 
 Kawabata Makoto - Production and Engineering
 Yoshida Tatsuya - Digital Mastering
 Kawabata Sachiko - Art Work

References 

2009 albums
Acid Mothers Temple albums